Pehr Magnebrant (born 30 September 1970) is a Swedish professional golfer.

Magnebrant played on the Challenge Tour 1992–2004 and won twice. His first professional win came in 1998 in Riva dei Tessali, near Castellaneta, Italy, were he beat future PGA Tour winner John Senden in a play-off.

He also played 19 events on the European Tour where his best performance was a tie for seventh at the 2001 Madeira Island Open.

Professional wins (4)

Challenge Tour wins (2)

Nordic Golf League wins (1)

Other wins (1) 
2002 Täljepokalen

Team appearances
Amateur
European Amateur Team Championship (representing Sweden): 1991

References

External links

Swedish male golfers
European Tour golfers
Golfers from Stockholm
1970 births
Living people